Volapük or Volapuk may refer to:

 Volapük, a constructed language
 Volapük (band), a French avant-garde rock band
 Volapuk encoding, an ASCII transliteration system for the Cyrillic alphabet